The first edition of the Women's Asian Amateur Boxing Championships were held from August 25 to August 29, 2001, in Bangkok, Thailand.

Medalists

Medal table

References
amateur-boxing
Results

Asian Amateur Boxing Championships